Antiquity or Antiquities may refer to:

Historical objects or periods

Artifacts
Antiquities, objects or artifacts surviving from ancient cultures

Eras
Any period before the European Middle Ages (5th to 15th centuries) but still within the history of Western civilization, including:
Ancient history, any historical period before the Middle Ages
Classical antiquity, the classical civilizations of the Mediterranean such as Greece and Rome
Late antiquity, the period between classical antiquity and the Middle Ages

Scholarly journals
Antiquity (journal), a journal of archaeological research
American Antiquity, a journal of the Society for American Archaeology
Latin American Antiquity, a journal of the Society for American Archaeology

Other uses
Antiquity, Ohio, a community in the United States
Antiquity (whisky), a brand of Indian whisky
Antiquities (Magic: The Gathering), an expansion set for the card game Magic: The Gathering
Antiquity (album), a 1975 album by Jackie McLean and Michael Carvin

See also
Age (disambiguation)
Ancient (disambiguation)
Antique (disambiguation)
Antiquitates (disambiguation)